This is a list of all United States Supreme Court cases from volume 533 of the United States Reports:

External links

2001 in United States case law